Clement Isaac "Ike" Quartey is a former Ghanaian boxer and Ghana's first Olympic medalist. He won the silver medal in the men's Light Welterweight (63.5 kg) category at the 1960 Summer Olympics in Rome, Italy.

History
Better known as "Isaac" or "Ike", he was born April 12, 1938, in Accra, Ghana. Clement is an older brother of former welterweight champion Ike Quartey. He is the first black Ghanaian to win a medal at the Olympics, and he also won a gold medal at the 1962 British Empire and Commonwealth Games held in Perth, Western Australia.(born April 12, 1938, in Accra)

Fights

Olympic games results
1960 (as a Light welterweight)

Defeated Mohamed Boubekeur (Romania) 5-0

Defeated Khalid Al-Karkhi (Iraq) 5-0

Defeated Kim Deuk-Bong (South Korea) 3-2

Defeated Marian Kasprzyk (Poland) walk-over

Lost to Bohumil Nemecek (Czechoslovakia) 0-5

References

1938 births
Living people
Ga-Adangbe people
Olympic boxers of Ghana
Boxers at the 1960 Summer Olympics
Olympic silver medalists for Ghana
Commonwealth Games gold medallists for Ghana
Boxers at the 1962 British Empire and Commonwealth Games
Boxers from Accra
Place of birth missing (living people)
Olympic medalists in boxing
Ghanaian male boxers
Medalists at the 1960 Summer Olympics
Commonwealth Games medallists in boxing
Light-welterweight boxers
Medallists at the 1962 British Empire and Commonwealth Games